Jenny De Smet (born 3 July 1958) is a former Belgian racing cyclist. She won the Belgian national road race title in 1982.

References

External links

1958 births
Living people
Belgian female cyclists
People from Hamme
Cyclists from East Flanders